Alex Métayer (1930–2004) was a French humorist.

1930 births
2004 deaths
20th-century French people
French humorists
French male writers
Burials at Montparnasse Cemetery
20th-century French male writers